Pattanakkad is a village in Alappuzha district in the Indian state of Kerala. This is a panchayat which come under the Cherthala Assembly constituency.

Location

Demographics
 India census, Pattanakkad had a population of 30,867 with 14,990 males and 15,877 females.

References

Villages in Alappuzha district